NCAA Final Four 2004 is a video game developed by 989 Sports and published by Sony Computer Entertainment America for PlayStation 2 in 2003. On the cover is then-Kansas Jayhawks player Nick Collison.

Reception

The game received "generally unfavorable reviews" according to the review aggregation website Metacritic.

References

2003 video games
Basketball video games
NCAA video games
North America-exclusive video games
PlayStation 2 games
PlayStation 2-only games
Video games developed in the United States
Video games set in 2004
Video games set in the United States